The Kimball House is a historic house at 713 North Front Street in Dardanelle, Arkansas.  It is a two-story brick building, covered by a hip roof, with a single-story porch extending across the front, supported by square posts with chamfered corners and moulded capitals.  The building corners have brick quoining, and the roof eave has paired brackets in the Italianate style.  Windows are set in segmented-arch openings.  Built in 1876, it is one of the city's finest examples of Italianate architecture.

The house was listed on the National Register of Historic Places in 1982.

See also
National Register of Historic Places listings in Yell County, Arkansas

References

Houses on the National Register of Historic Places in Arkansas
Italianate architecture in Arkansas
Houses completed in 1876
1876 establishments in Arkansas